The Wolfsberg Group is a non-governmental association of thirteen global banks. It started as a meeting of banks in 1999 who adopted a number of best practice standards under the name Wolfsberg Principles. On 22 September 2021 the association under Swiss law under the name "The Wolfsberg Group" was founded in Basel. 

The Wolfsberg Group's goal has been to develop financial industry standards for anti-money laundering (AML), know your customer (KYC) and counter terrorist financing (CTF) policies. Its work is similar to what the Financial Action Task Force on Money Laundering (FATF) does on a government level. In addition to its AML-activities, the Wolfsberg Group also serves as a collective action group in the field of anti-corruption. The Wolfsberg Group has criticized FATF's draft AML revision as "too prescriptive and too narrowly conceived". The group operates in relative obscurity without press coverage.

History
In 1999, the U.S. Senate Permanent Subcommittee on Investigations called Citigroup's chief executive officer, John Reed, to testify in a public hearing on what the chairman of the Committee, Senator Carl Levin, called a "rogues gallery" of clients at Citibank's private bank. Mr. Reed turned to the new head of the Private Bank, Shaukat Aziz (later to become the Prime Minister of Pakistan) to take actions to both resolve allegations and ensure against future such events.

Mr. Aziz in New York called Frank Vogl, then vice chairman of the board of directors of Transparency International (based in Washington DC), to discuss a joint initiative. They met and Mr. Aziz explained it would be more credible if Transparency International, rather than Citi, invited other leading banks to join Citi in exploring efforts to attain voluntary understandings by major banks to full enforce know-your-customer standards.

A dinner was then organized in New York at Citi, co-hosted by Mr. Aziz and Mr. Vogl, was attended by representatives in New York of major banks, as well as then TI chairman Peter Eigen and then TI-USA board chairman Fritz Heimann. That meeting initiated discussions, led by Mr. Aziz and by the then chief risk officer, Hans-Peter Bauer of UBS in Switzerland.

A meeting was convened at UBS's training center at Schloss Wolfsberg, near Ermatingen in Switzerland. The venue provided the name for the group.

Work proceeded by representatives of the banks and by Jermyn Brooks, a senior executive at Transparency International, which resulted in the first formulation of the Wolfsberg AML Principles. There were originally eight banks, and except for the US and Switzerland, most countries were represented by their largest private bank. Later "a major US investment bank, a large bank from Japan, and a Spanish bank" joined for the original eleven member-group.
 
In 2000, the Wolfsberg Group was an informal association of the following eleven global banks: Banco Santander, MUFG, Barclays, Citigroup, Credit Suisse, Deutsche Bank, Goldman Sachs, HSBC, J.P. Morgan Chase, Société Générale and UBS.

After 9/11, the group changed its focus to counter terrorist-financing standards.

On 22 September 2021 the previously loosely associated group of banks founded an association under Swiss law under the name "The Wolfsberg Group" with registered domicile in Basel, Switzerland.

In May 2022, in the context of the 2022 Russian invasion of Ukraine the group suggested banks screen their bank customers for negative news stories, in order to assess their financial crime risk. Dow Jones News Service criticized the document as it did not address the importance of using licensed media in assessing the credibility of negative news media sources identified on the internet.

Current members
In June 2015, the Wolfsberg Group expanded to thirteen member banks as Standard Chartered Bank joined the association and Bank of America was mentioned as an existing member in the same notice.
Banco Santander
Bank of America
Barclays
Citigroup
Credit Suisse
Deutsche Bank
Goldman Sachs
HSBC
J.P. Morgan Chase
MUFG
Société Générale
Standard Chartered
UBS

Publications
 the Wolfsberg Group has issued 14 documents they call The Wolfsberg Standards.
The first document published in October 2000 was the Wolfsberg Anti-Money Laundering Principles for Private Banking, and revised in May 2002.

In November 2002, the group published the Wolfsberg Correspondent Banking Principles, in which they recommended a risk-based approach to AML and to develop an international registry for financial institutions, where those would submit information useful for conducting due diligence. After collaborating with Bankers Almanac, part of Accuity, it launched a Due Diligence Repository as a module separate from its service to support.

In September 2003 the group published the Wolfsberg Monitoring Screening & Searching Principles, in March 2006 the Wolfsberg Managing Money Laundering Risks, in March 2011 the Wolfsberg Trade Finance Principles, in October 2011 the Wolfsberg Guidance on Prepaid & Stored Value Cards, in 2012 the Wolfsberg Private Banking Principles, in 2014 the 14-page Wolfsberg Group Mobile and Internet Payment Services (MIPS) Paper, and a revision of Wolfsberg Correspondent Banking Principles.
In 2019 they published a guidance on sanctions screening for financial institutions to assess their effectiveness of sanctions screening.
 In 2019,

Outreach
The Wolfsberg Group meets with financial industry bodies, such as the European Banking Federation, the International Banking Federation, the New York Clearing House, and the Society for Worldwide Interbank Financial Telecommunication (SWIFT).

In January 2011, the group commented on the Financial Action Task Force on Money Laundering (FATF), draft review of its 2003 AML/CTF standards. The Wolfsberg Group "caution[ed] FATF not to make recommendations or issue guidance that is too prescriptive with regard to any of the various risk indicators…for example that all foreign Politically Exposed Persons (PEPs) present a heightened risk", that "a categorical approach [is] not only unnecessary but fundamentally counterproductive", "too prescriptive and too narrowly conceived".

Press coverage and criticism
The group has issued four press releases: in April 2007, in May 2008 regarding the Revised politically exposed person FAQs, and in January 2015 about the US Treasury having incorporated "advanced sanctions list" format, based on data standards developed by the United Nations and the Wolfsberg Group.

Robert Mazur, a former undercover US DEA agent investigating money laundering, called the Wolfsberg group "wolves [...] guarding the sheep".

See also

Basel Committee on Banking Supervision
OECD Anti-Bribery Convention
Bank for International Settlements

References

External links
 Wolfsberg Group official site

Financial crime prevention
Banking organizations
International banking institutions
Oversight and watchdog organizations